A total lunar eclipse will take place on April 26, 2051.

This will be the third lunar eclipse in the 2050-2051 tetrad.

Visibility

Related lunar eclipses

Lunar year series

Saros series

Half-Saros cycle
A lunar eclipse will be preceded and followed by solar eclipses by 9 years and 5.5 days (a half saros). This lunar eclipse is related to two total solar eclipses of Solar Saros 139.

See also 
List of lunar eclipses and List of 21st-century lunar eclipses

Notes

External links 
 

2051-04
2051-04
2051 in science